Dana Swanson (born November 8, 1981 at Atlanta, Georgia) is an American singer, actress, writer, comedian and the current voice of SARA v3.0 for Toonami as of April 27, 2013. She replaces Sally Timms and Kath Soucie as SARA's voice and serves as supporting host to TOM v5.0, voiced by Steve Blum.

Swanson attended the University of Georgia, where she graduated with a degree in TeleArts in 2004, joined Williams Street the following year as a production coordinator and was promoted to a writer/producer role in 2010. Swanson is also a member of the band "Le Sexoflex" under the pseudonym Miss Lady Flex. Swanson (under the name Insane-o-flex) also co-wrote and performed "I Like Your Booty (But I'm Not Gay)" for the Aqua Teen Hunger Force Colon Movie Film for Theaters'''s soundtrack.

On April 27, 2013, when Toonami overhauled its look by introducing the TOM 5 era and retiring the TOM 3.5 era look that and from May 26, 2012, to April 20, 2013, on Adult Swim (TOM 3.5 was an HD version of the TOM 3.0 look from 2004-07 on Cartoon Network), SARA made a surprise return to the block after several years' absence with an updated look and voiced by Swanson. The current SARA look is a full-bodied fairy hologram.

Swanson provided the voice of a member of the band "Advantage" in the Homestar Runner'' DVD-exclusive toon "The Limozeen Advantage".

References

1981 births
Living people
American voice actresses
American television writers
Cartoon Network people
21st-century American singers
21st-century American women singers
21st-century American actresses
American women television writers